Ya with diaeresis (Я̈ я̈; italics: Я̈ я̈) is a letter of the Cyrillic script.

Ya with diaeresis is used in the Selkup language.

See also
Cyrillic characters in Unicode

Cyrillic letters with diacritics
Letters with diaeresis